The killing of Türkan Feyzullah occurred on December 26, 1984, in Mogilyane, People's Republic of Bulgaria. Türkan Feyzullah (Bulgarian: Тюркян Фейзула) was a Turkish baby, who died after a bullet hit her when Bulgarian militsia shot at a group of people, peaceful protesting against the forceful Bulgarisation policy held then.

Event 
On December 24, 1984, protests started in Mlechino against Bulgarisation policy of Bulgarian government and human right violations of Turks from Bulgaria. Türkan's mother attended the protests. The protests continued until December 26 when they were violently suppressed by the Bulgarian militsia. Bulgarian militsioners started shooting at protesters, bullets wounded tens of people and killed 3. The deaths included Türkan Feyzullah, who was 18 months old then. Türkan died instantly in her mother's arms when the bullet hit upon her. Her killer was never arrested.

Legacy 
Türkan became symbol of Turkish resistance against Bulgarisation after her death. She is remembered at her grave every year with prayers at 26 December. Several monuments of Türkan exist in both Turkey and Bulgaria. A memorial fountain and a monument have been built on the site of the event, where commemorative celebrations are held every year on the day of the killing.

A monument was put up in Bursa in Türkan's memory. Her brother Turhan Öztürk said in an interview about the persecution of the Turkish minority in Bulgaria: "They wanted to destroy our Turkish identity. The villagers didn't stay silent and marched in protest. Soldiers shot at defenseless people. My 18-month-old sibling was killed in my mother's arms. This left deep scars on my mom. All this showed you cannot make a people forget their roots. People must know what this monument stands for, the new generations must remember."

Türkan is commemorated every year with a poem written for her and carved on her memorial stone:

They called me Türkan

I had reached one and a half years old.

The cruel took my name

I got on my mother's back for the dirty road

you can't force this we said

Without checking left or right

they shot a bullet into my head

See also
List of unsolved murders

References 

1983 births
1984 deaths
1984 in Bulgaria
1984 in military history
Bulgarian people of Turkish descent
Deaths by firearm in Bulgaria
Deaths by person in Europe
December 1984 crimes
December 1984 events in Europe
Female murder victims
History of Kardzhali Province
Incidents of violence against girls
Murdered Bulgarian children
People murdered in Bulgaria
Protest-related deaths
Unsolved murders in Bulgaria
1984 murders in Bulgaria